A firm is a commercial partnership of two or more people.

Firm or The Firm may also refer to:

Entertainment

Film and television
 The Firm (1989 film), a British drama
 The Firm (1993 film), an American legal thriller based on John Grisham's novel
 The Firm (2009 film), a remake of the 1989 film
 The Firm (2012 TV series), a Canadian television series
 The Firm (Malaysian TV series), a TV series that began in 2007

Music
 The Firm (album), album by rock group The Firm
 The Firm (soundtrack), an album by Dave Grusin
 The Firm (hip hop group), an American hip hop supergroup between 1996 and 1998
 The Firm (novelty band), a band best known for their hits "Star Trekkin'" and "Arthur Daley E's Alright"
 The Firm (rock band), a British rock band that was active from 1984 to 1986 with Paul Rodgers and Jimmy Page.

Other entertainment
 The Firm (novel), a novel by John Grisham
 The Firm: The Inside Story of McKinsey, a book by Duff McDonald
 "The Firm", J. C. Williamson's, Australian show-business organization

Ships
 USS Firm (AM-444), an Aggressive-class minesweeper launched in 1953
 USS Firm (AM-98), an Adroit-class minesweeper laid down in 1941

Other
 The Firm, slang for the inner British royal family
 The FIRM, a brand of workout videos and fitness products
 The Firm, Inc., a talent management company
 Fair Immigration Reform Movement
 Flood insurance rate map

See also
 Hooligan firm, a violent football supporters' group
 Fishery Resources Monitoring System (FIRMS)